Andy Sertich (born May 6, 1983) is a former American-Croatian professional ice hockey player whose final team before retirement in 2017 was the Nottingham Panthers of the British EIHL.

Playing career
As an amateur he played hockey for one of the strongest American collegiate teams the University of Minnesota. Through four years of playing with the Gophers his teammates were today's stars such as Thomas Vanek, Paul Martin and Phil Kessel. In the four years of playing in the WCHA Sertich played 171 games with 27 goals and 39 assists. Sertich was selected in the 2002 NHL Entry Draft 136th overall by the Pittsburgh Penguins, though he never played for them. In the 2008–09 season he played for the ECHL League team Utah Grizzlies, where in over 62 games he scored 12 goals and had 24 assists, which saw him as the best defender on his team by points. Along with Utah, he played 6 games for the Bridgeport Sound Tigers of the American Hockey League, the second strongest league in the North American continent.

On May 28, 2009, with eligibility to play for the Croatian national team, Sertich left America signing a one-year contract with Croat team KHL Medveščak for the 2009–10 season. In 54 games Sertich scored 8 goals for 34 points to lead all Medveščak Zagreb defensemen in points and was re-signed to a one-year extension on April 1, 2010.

After splitting the 2013–14 season with the Graz 99ers and Alba Volán Székesfehérvár Sertich joined as a free agent, his fourth EBEL club, Dornbirner EC on June 16, 2014.

After six seasons in the EBEL, Sertich left as a free agent for a new European opportunity in agreeing to a one-year contract with Norwegian club, Stavanger Oilers of the GET-ligaen on July 23, 2015.

In 2013, Sertich played for the Croatian national team at the IIHF World Championship Division II.

Career statistics

Regular season and playoffs

International

References

External links 

Andy Sertich's profile at KHL Medveščak

1983 births
Living people
People from Coleraine, Minnesota
Fehérvár AV19 players
American people of Croatian descent
American men's ice hockey defensemen
Bridgeport Sound Tigers players
Dornbirn Bulldogs players
Graz 99ers players
KHL Medveščak Zagreb players
Minnesota Golden Gophers men's ice hockey players
NCAA men's ice hockey national champions
Nottingham Panthers players
Pittsburgh Penguins draft picks
Sioux Falls Stampede players
Stavanger Oilers players
Utah Grizzlies (ECHL) players
Ice hockey players from Minnesota
Croatian ice hockey defencemen